David McDuff (born 1945, Sale, Cheshire, England) is a Scottish translator, editor and literary critic.

Life
McDuff attended the University of Edinburgh, where he studied Russian and German, gaining a PhD in 1971. He married mathematician Dusa McDuff, but they separated around 1975. After living for some time in the Soviet Union, Denmark,  Iceland, and the United States, he eventually returned to the United Kingdom, where he worked for several years as a co-editor and reviewer on the literary magazine Stand.  He then moved to London, where he began his career as a literary translator.

McDuff's translations include both foreign poetry and prose, including poems by Joseph Brodsky and Tomas Venclova, and novels including Fyodor Dostoyevsky's Crime and Punishment, The Brothers Karamazov, and The Idiot (all three in Penguin Classics). His Complete Poems of Edith Södergran (1984, 1992) and Complete Poems of Karin Boye (1994) were published by Bloodaxe Books. McDuff’s translation of the Finnish-language author Tuomas Kyrö’s 2011 novel The Beggar and the Hare was published in 2014.

Among literary awards, he has received the 1994 TLS/George Bernard Shaw Translation Prize for his translation of 
Gösta Ågren's poems, A Valley In The Midst of Violence, published by Bloodaxe, and the 2006 Stora Pris of the Finland-Swedish Writers' Association (Finlands svenska författareförening), Helsinki.

From 2007 to 2010, David McDuff worked as an editor and translator with Prague Watchdog, the Prague-based NGO which monitored and discussed human rights abuses in Chechnya and the North Caucasus.

McDuff was honoured with the Finnish State Award for Foreign Translators in 2013.

In November 2019 McDuff's new translation of Karin Boye's dystopian novel Kallocain was published by Penguin Classics.

McDuff was honoured with the Swedish Academy's Interpretation Prize (Tolkningspris) 2021. 

McDuff’s translation of Anteckningar by Tua Forsström (I walked on into the forest, Bloodaxe, 2021) was The Poetry Book Society's Translation Choice for Winter 2021.

Works
Osip Mandelʹshtam Selected poems, Writers and Readers, 1983,  
Edith Södergran Complete poems, Bloodaxe Books, 1984,  
Marina Tsvetaeva, Selected Poems, Bloodaxe Books, 1987,  
Ice around our lips: Finland-Swedish poetry, Bloodaxe Books, 1989,  
Tua Forsström, Snow leopard, Bloodaxe, 1990,  

Andrei Bely Petersburg, Penguin. 1995. 
Ivan Sergeevich Turgenev, Rudin: On the eve, Oxford University Press, 1999,  
Fyodor Dostoyevsky (30 January 2003). Crime and Punishment. Penguin Books Limited. 

Tua Forsström, I studied once at a wonderful faculty, Bloodaxe, 2006, 
Karin Boye, Kallocain, Penguin Classics, 2019, 
Tua Forsström, I walked on into the forest, Bloodaxe, 2021,

References

External links
 The complete list of McDuff's published books of translation
Database entry at Bloodaxe Books
Prague Watchdog's select bibliography of Chechnya-related works, compiled by David McDuff and others

1945 births
Living people
Translators of Fyodor Dostoyevsky
Alumni of the University of Edinburgh
Swedish–English translators
Russian–English translators
Finnish–English translators
People from Sale, Greater Manchester
20th-century British translators
21st-century British translators
Reeves family